TADB is a database of Type 2 toxin-antitoxin loci in bacterial and archaeal genomes.

See also
Toxin-antitoxin system

References

External links
 TADB

Biological databases
Plasmids
Non-coding RNA
Toxins
RNA-binding proteins